Paulo Roberto dos Santos (born 23 October 1958), known as Paulo Roberto Santos or Paulo Roberto, is a Brazilian football manager and former player who played as a left back. He is the current manager of São Bento.

Career
Paulo Roberto was born in Rio de Janeiro, and played as a left back. A Botafogo youth graduate, he spent the vast majority of his career with lower league clubs.

Paulo Roberto began his managerial career in 1988, with Pouso Alegre FC. He only came into prominence in the early 2000s, after being in charge of Rio Claro while the club achieved successive promotions in the lower levels of the Campeonato Paulista.

Paulo Roberto managed Série C sides Grêmio Barueri in 2006 and Paysandu in 2007, achieving promotion with the former. He was subsequently in charge of Atlético Sorocaba, winning the club's major title (Copa Paulista) in 2008.

On 30 July 2013, Paulo Roberto was appointed manager of Santo André. On 1 November, he was named São Bento manager, and took the club to the third place of the ensuing Campeonato Paulista Série A2, achieving promotion to the first division.

Paulo Roberto was appointed at the helm of São Caetano on 3 June 2014, but returned to São Bento in November.

On 2 June 2015, Paulo Roberto was appointed Guarani manager. Dismissed on 23 August, he rejoined São Bento on 17 September, achieving two consecutive promotions (2016 Série D and 2017 Série C).

Honours

Manager
Gama
Campeonato Brasiliense: 1994, 1998

Rio Claro
Campeonato Paulista Série B1: 2002

Atlético Sorocaba
Copa Paulista: 2008

References

External links
 FutebolCia profile 
 

1958 births
Living people
Footballers from Rio de Janeiro (city)
Brazilian footballers
Brazilian football managers
Association football defenders
Brazilian expatriate football managers
Brazilian expatriate sportspeople in Saudi Arabia
Campeonato Brasileiro Série B players
Campeonato Brasileiro Série B managers
Campeonato Brasileiro Série C managers
Campeonato Brasileiro Série D managers
Botafogo de Futebol e Regatas players
America Football Club (RJ) players
Bonsucesso Futebol Clube players
Moto Club de São Luís players
Sampaio Corrêa Futebol Clube players
Galícia Esporte Clube players
Criciúma Esporte Clube players
Club Sportivo Sergipe players
Associação Desportiva Confiança players
Pouso Alegre Futebol Clube managers
Rio Claro Futebol Clube managers
Sociedade Esportiva do Gama managers
Uberaba Sport Club managers
Associação Atlética Anapolina managers
União São João Esporte Clube managers
Capivariano Futebol Clube managers
Araxá Esporte Clube managers
Grêmio Barueri Futebol managers
Botafogo Futebol Clube (SP) managers
Paysandu Sport Club managers
Clube Atlético Sorocaba managers
Rio Branco Atlético Clube managers
Esporte Clube Noroeste managers
Boa Esporte Clube managers
União Agrícola Barbarense Futebol Clube managers
Esporte Clube Santo André managers
Esporte Clube São Bento managers
Associação Desportiva São Caetano managers
Guarani FC managers
Sampaio Corrêa Futebol Clube managers
Associação Ferroviária de Esportes managers